Massachusetts Right to Repair Initiative may refer to:
 Massachusetts Right to Repair Initiative (2012)
 Massachusetts Right to Repair Initiative (2020)